Sir Wilfrid Percy Henry Sheldon (1901-1983), KCVO, MD, FRCP, FRCOG, was a prominent English consulting physician. He authored of one of the first major textbooks of pediatric medicine and was Physician-Pediatrician to the Household of Queen Elizabeth II for nearly 20 years. Together with researchers in Holland, Sheldon was responsible for the discovery that coeliac disease is related to wheat products in the diet.

Education and career
Wilfrid Percy Henry Sheldon was born on 23 November 1901 at Woodford, Essex. He attended Bancroft's School in Woodford, King's College, London, and King's College Hospital, London, graduating from the latter in 1923. In 1926, he was appointed consulting pediatrician at King's College Hospital and became consultant physician to the Hospital for Sick Children in Great Ormond Street several years later. He was one of the few full-time early practitioners of pediatric medicine in Britain during this era, when volunteer hospital consultants were not paid for their services.

During the Second World War, Sheldon organized hospitals for children evacuated from London. In 1947 he became director of the department of child health at King's College Hospital.

Sir Wilfrid was Physician-Pediatrician to the Household of Queen Elizabeth II from 1952 to 1971, a period spanning the childhoods of the royal siblings Charles, Anne, Andrew and Edward. He also maintained a private practice in Harley Street, London.

As an advisor in child health to the Department of Health (United Kingdom) from 1952 to 1961, Sheldon was closely involved in establishing pediatric medical programs under the National Health Service.

Sheldon was made Commander of the Royal Victorian Order in 1954, and Knight Commander in 1959. During the later years of his life, he lived in the Coombe neighborhood of Kingston upon Thames.

Publications
 Text Book of Diseases of Infancy and Childhood (1936)
 Dietary Starch and Fat Absorption (1949)
 List of medical journal articles authored by Wilfrid Sheldon, University College of London Institute of Child Health

See also
 British Pathe newsreel: Queen Visits Great Ormond Street Hospital (1952).  Princess Elizabeth (Queen Elizabeth II)  and Dr. Wilfrid Sheldon.

References
 Sheldon, Sir Wilfrid Percy Henry (1901–1983), by Peter Tizard, rev. Oxford Dictionary of National Biography, Oxford University Press, 2004; online edn, May 2011 accessed
 Obituary, British Medical Journal, 24 September 1983 and 1 October 1983 
 Obituary, The Lancet, 24 September 1983
 Clinical Research in Britain, 1950 - 1980, a Witness Seminar held at the Wellcome Institute for the History of Medicine, 9 June 1998
 Paediatrics at King's Hospital 50 Years Ago, Archives of Disease in Childhood, 1989
 Lives of the Fellows, Munks Roll, Volume VII, Royal College of Physicians of London

Footnotes

20th-century English medical doctors
1901 births
1983 deaths
Physicians of Great Ormond Street Hospital